Graphea marmorea is a moth of the family Erebidae first described by William Schaus in 1894. It is found in Panama, Peru, Venezuela and Brazil.

References

Phaegopterina
Moths described in 1894